Henry Jines was an American vaudeville actor. He starred in stage productions including Irvin Miller's Broadway Rastus, and performed in blackface.

Jines was from Atlanta, Georgia. In 1913 he had reportedly been writing vaudeville sketches and lyrics for about six years. The St. Louis Argus reviewed a show he featured in with Frank Montgomery, Blondie Robinson, Frank "Chinese" Walker, and Florence McClain February 1921.

Theater
Broadway Rastus (revue) (1917)
Broadway Scandals (1921)
Swing It (1937) as Rusty

See also
Minstrel show
Vaudeville

References

External links
Auctioned photograph and accompanying biographical details from Worthpoint

Vaudeville performers
Blackface minstrel performers
Date of birth unknown
Date of death unknown